The 2002 Budweiser Shootout was the first exhibition stock car race of the 2004 NASCAR Nextel Cup Series season and the 24th iteration of the event. The race was held on Sunday, February 10, 2002, in Daytona Beach, Florida, at Daytona International Speedway, a 2.5-mile (4.0-km) permanent triangular-shaped superspeedway. The race took the scheduled 70 laps to complete. At race's end, Joe Gibbs Racing driver Tony Stewart would manage to dominate the second half of the race to take his second career Budweiser Shootout victory. To fill out the top three, Dale Earnhardt, Inc. driver Dale Earnhardt Jr. and Hendrick Motorsports driver Jeff Gordon would finish second and third, respectively.

Background 

Daytona International Speedway is one of three superspeedways to hold NASCAR races, the other two being Indianapolis Motor Speedway and Talladega Superspeedway. The standard track at Daytona International Speedway is a four-turn superspeedway that is 2.5 miles (4.0 km) long. The track's turns are banked at 31 degrees, while the front stretch, the location of the finish line, is banked at 18 degrees.

Format and eligibility 
Caution laps would be counted, but the finish had to be under green, with the Truck Series green-white-checker rule used if necessary. A minimum of one two-tire green flag pit stop was required. The Bud Shootout Qualifier was discontinued because second round qualifying for Cup races had been eliminated.

Pole winners of the previous season were automatically eligible for the race. Then, previous winners who had not already qualified would receive automatic births.

Entry list 

 (R) denotes rookie driver.

Lineup 
The starting lineup for the race was set by a random draw. Roush Racing driver Kurt Busch would manage to draw pole.

Race results

References 

2002 NASCAR Winston Cup Series
NASCAR races at Daytona International Speedway
February 2002 sports events in the United States
2002 in sports in Florida